Chi Aurigae, Latinized from χ Aurigae, is the Bayer designation for a binary star system in the northern constellation of Auriga. It is faintly visible to the naked eye with an apparent visual magnitude of 4.74. The annual parallax shift of this object is much smaller than the measurement error, making distance estimates by that means unreliable. The estimated distance to this star is approximately 3,000 light years. The brightness of the star is diminished by 1.26 in magnitude from extinction caused by intervening gas and dust.

Chi Aurigae is a spectroscopic binary with an orbital period of 676.85 d and an eccentricity of 0.12. The primary component of this system is a supergiant star with a stellar classification of B5 Iab. It has a stellar wind that is causing mass loss at the rate of 0.38–0.46 × 10−9 solar masses per year, or the equivalent of the Sun's mass every 2.4 billion years.

References

External links
 HR 1843
 Image Chi Aurigae

036371
Spectroscopic binaries
025984
Aurigae, Chi
Auriga (constellation)
B-type supergiants
Aurigae, 25
1843
Durchmusterung objects